Chajjwal is very small village located on Satayana road in Faisalabad, Pakistan. The total distance from Faisalabad is 30 km. There exists a famous city known as Tandlianwala 15 km from Chajjwal. Chajjwal is a small village with only 5,000 people living in it.

Villages in Faisalabad District